Tiit Matsulevitš (born September 27, 1958) is an Estonian politician. He was a member of X Riigikogu.

References

Living people
1958 births
Estonian politicians
Place of birth missing (living people)
Members of the Riigikogu, 2003–2007